Władysław Dobrowolski (2 January 1896 – 25 February 1969) was a Polish fencer and track and field athlete, Major of the Polish Army in the defence of Warsaw, imprisoned during World War II. During the interwar period, he won a bronze medal in the team sabre event at the 1932 Summer Olympics.

As a young man, active in independence movement, Dobrowolski was a member of the Polish Military Organization. He fought in the Polish-Soviet War and in the September Campaign of World War II. He was decorated in Stalinist Poland.

Honours and awards
 Silver Cross of the Virtuti Militari
 Cross of Independence
 Cross of Valour
 Silver Cross of Merit

References

External links
 

1896 births
1969 deaths
People from Będzin
Polish male fencers
Polish male sprinters
Olympic fencers of Poland
Olympic athletes of Poland
Athletes (track and field) at the 1924 Summer Olympics
Fencers at the 1932 Summer Olympics
Fencers at the 1936 Summer Olympics
Olympic bronze medalists for Poland
Olympic medalists in fencing
Polish Military Organisation members
Polish people of the Polish–Soviet War
Polish military personnel of World War II
Recipients of the Silver Cross of the Virtuti Militari
Recipients of the Cross of Independence
Recipients of the Cross of Valour (Poland)
Recipients of the Silver Cross of Merit (Poland)
Medalists at the 1932 Summer Olympics
People from Piotrków Governorate
Sportspeople from Silesian Voivodeship
19th-century Polish people
20th-century Polish people